This is a list of the governors of the province of Sar-e Pol, Afghanistan.

Governors of Sar-e Pol Province

See also
 List of current governors of Afghanistan

References

Sar-e Pol